Adolphus Staton (August 28, 1879 – June 4, 1964) was born in Tarboro, North Carolina, and died in Chevy Chase, Maryland. He graduated from the United States Naval Academy in 1902.

He received the Medal of Honor for actions at the United States occupation of Veracruz, 1914. Staton was awarded the Navy Cross in World War I for his actions when his ship, the Mount Vernon, was torpedoed.  He served in World War II, and retired from the military in 1947. He worked in Naval Intelligence and attended the Naval War College and Army War College in addition to earning a law degree from George Washington University Law School. He is buried in Arlington National Cemetery.

Medal of Honor citation

Rank and organization: Lieutenant Organization: U.S. Navy Born:28 August 1879, Tarboro, N.C. Accredited to: North Carolina Place/Date: Vera Cruz, Mexico, 22 April 1914

Citation:

For distinguished conduct in battle, engagement of Vera Cruz, 22 April 1914; was eminent and conspicuous in command of his battalion. He exhibited courage and skill in leading his men through the action of the 22d and in the final occupation of the city.

Gallery

See also

List of Medal of Honor recipients (Veracruz)
List of United States Naval Academy alumni (Medal of Honor)

References

External links

Recipients of the Navy Cross (United States)
1879 births
1964 deaths
Burials at Arlington National Cemetery
United States Navy Medal of Honor recipients
United States Naval Academy alumni
United States Navy admirals
United States Navy World War II admirals
Virginia Military Institute alumni
People from Tarboro, North Carolina
Battle of Veracruz (1914) recipients of the Medal of Honor